Kerri ní Dochartaigh (born 1983) is a Northern Irish writer known for her nature writings. She has published in The Guardian, The Irish Times and elsewhere, and her 2020 debut book Thin Places was shortlisted for the Wainwright Prize.

Biography
ní Dochartaigh was born in 1983 in Derry in Northern Ireland, near the Irish border. Her mother was Catholic and her father Protestant, and when she was aged 11, living in the Waterside area, their home was petrol-bombed in the night. The family moved to a Catholic area, and then out of the town to Ballykelly, 20 miles away. When she was 16, a boy she was friends with was murdered an hour after she had seen him, and his murderer has not been identified.

She read English Literature and Classics at Trinity College Dublin. She then taught for periods in Rudolf Steiner schools in Edinburgh and Bristol.

Writing career
ní Dochartaigh has published in The Guardian, The Irish Times, Winter Papers, Caught By The River and elsewhere,

Her 2020 book Thin Places was published by Canongate Books after a six-way contest between publishers. It is "a mixture of memoir, history and nature writing" and describes "a wild Ireland, an invisible border, an old conflict and the healing power of the natural world", and was shortlisted for the 2020 Wainwright Prize for UK Nature Writing.

In March 2021 ní Dochartaigh featured in BBC Radio 4's series The Outsiders: "Five writers on how a year of lockdowns has changed their relationship with the nature on their doorstep", and in August 2021 she appeared at the Edinburgh International Book Festival, online, along with composer and writer Kerry Andrew.

Personal life
 she lives "in an old railway cottage in the very heart of Ireland" with her partner and her dog.

Selected publications

Books

Other writings

References

1983 births
Living people
21st-century women writers from Northern Ireland
British nature writers
Date of birth missing (living people)